Cincinnatus Fabian D’Abreo was an administrator and politician  in Karachi, British India.

Biography
He was born on 24 September 1862. His father, Manuel D’Abreo had migrated to Sindh in 1846. Cincinnatus was married to Maggie Gomes with whom he had five children, Joe, Maggie, Alfred, Gwennie and Bill.

He was educated at St Patrick's High School, Karachi. However, he had to discontinue his studies at the age of 16 and earn a living, due to the unfortunate death of his father. He was first employed by the Civil and Military Gazette Press as a clerk. Two years later he joined the British business, Forbes, Forbes and Campbell, engaged in the import and export trade. In 1889, at the age of 27, he joined the Sind Commissioner's office as a clerk. In 1895 he was promoted to the position of assistant collector of Sukkur and finally was elected president of the municipality.

In 1897 he returned to Karachi, where he occupied various posts such as assistant collector of customs, and shipping master. He was appointed acting collector of customs on two occasions. He was a councillor of Karachi Municipality for many years and made a remarkable contribution to civic life in Karachi.

D’Abreo was instrumental in starting the Karachi Goan Association. He also played a part in the launch of the Indian Flour Mills, the Union Press, and the Indian Life Assurance Company, of which he was secretary for many years. He was also one of the directors of the Karachi Building and Development Company.

In 1917 he retired from service and devoted himself to various social activities. He was held in high esteem by the people of Karachi, who named him among the 12 leading citizens of Sindh. He died on 25 January 1929.

D'Abreo acquired  of land outside the cantonment. In 1908, this was developed into Karachi's first planned township named Cincinnatus Town, which today forms part of Garden East.

References

Goa politicians
People from British India
1862 births
1929 deaths
People of Portuguese India
St. Patrick's High School, Karachi alumni
Politicians from Karachi
Indian Roman Catholics
Pakistani Roman Catholics